A Provisional Irish Republican Army (IRA) assassination attempt against members of the British government took place on 12 October 1984 at the Grand Hotel in Brighton, East Sussex, England, United Kingdom. A long-delay time bomb was planted in the hotel by Patrick Magee before Prime Minister Margaret Thatcher and her cabinet arrived there for the Conservative Party conference. Although Thatcher narrowly escaped the blast, five people were killed, including the Conservative MP and Deputy Chief Whip Sir Anthony Berry, and a further 31 were injured.

Preparation
During the Troubles, as part of its armed campaign against British rule in Northern Ireland, the Provisional Irish Republican Army (IRA) regularly engaged in violent attacks, including bombings, against British authorities. While these incidents were largely confined to Northern Ireland, the IRA were known to carry out attacks in Britain itself, most recently with the Balcombe Street siege in 1975. By the late 1980s, Prime Minister Margaret Thatcher had come to the top of their list for assassination.

In October 1984, Thatcher's Conservative Party was scheduled to hold its conference at the Grand Hotel in Brighton, East Sussex. Patrick Magee, an IRA volunteer, stayed in the hotel under the pseudonym "Roy Walsh" on the weekend of 14–17 September. During his stay, he planted a bomb under the bath in his room, number 629, five floors above Thatcher's suite for the conference. The device was fitted with a long-delay timer made from videocassette recorder components and a Memo Park Timer safety device. IRA mole Sean O'Callaghan claimed that 20 lb (9 kg) of Frangex (gelignite) was used. The device was described as a "small bomb by IRA standards" by a contemporary news report and may have avoided detection by sniffer dogs by being wrapped in cling film to mask the smell.

Bombing
The bomb detonated at approximately 2:54 am (BST) on 12 October. The blast brought down a five-ton chimney stack, which crashed down through the floors into the basement, leaving a gaping hole in the hotel's façade. Firemen said that many lives were probably saved because the well-built Victorian hotel remained standing. Thatcher was still awake at the time, working in her suite on her conference speech for the next day. The blast badly damaged her suite's bathroom, but left its sitting room and bedroom untouched. She and her husband Denis escaped injury. She changed her clothes and was led out through the wreckage along with her husband and her friend and aide Cynthia Crawford, and driven to a Brighton police station.

At about 4:00 am, as Thatcher left the police station, she gave an impromptu interview to the BBC's John Cole saying that the conference would go on as usual. Alistair McAlpine persuaded Marks & Spencer to open early at 8:00 am so those who had lost their clothes in the bombing could purchase replacements. Thatcher went from the conference to visit the injured at the Royal Sussex County Hospital.

Casualties
The bombing killed five, none of whom were Cabinet ministers. A Conservative MP, Sir Anthony Berry (Deputy Chief Whip), was killed, along with Eric Taylor (North-West Area Chairman of the Conservative Party), Lady Shattock (Jeanne, wife of Sir Gordon Shattock, Western Area Chairman of the Conservative Party), Lady Maclean (Muriel, wife of Sir Donald Maclean, President of the Scottish Conservatives), and Roberta Wakeham (wife of Chief Whip John Wakeham). Donald and Muriel Maclean were in the room in which the bomb exploded, but Donald survived.

Several more were permanently disabled, including Walter Clegg, whose bedroom was directly above the blast, and Margaret Tebbit who fell 4 floors and after undergoing two years of treatment recovered some use of her hands but used a wheelchair for the rest of her life. Thirty-four people were left injured. When hospital staff asked Norman Tebbit, who was less seriously injured than his wife, Margaret, whether he was allergic to anything, he is said to have answered "bombs".

Aftermath

IRA statement
The IRA claimed responsibility the next day, and said that it would try again. Its statement read:

Thatcher's response
Thatcher began the next session of the conference at 9:30 am the following morning, as scheduled. She dropped from her speech most of her planned attacks on the Labour Party and said the bombing was "an attempt to cripple Her Majesty's democratically elected Government":

One of her biographers wrote that Thatcher's "coolness, in the immediate aftermath of the attack and in the hours after it, won universal admiration. Her defiance was another Churchillian moment in her premiership which seemed to encapsulate both her own steely character and the British public's stoical refusal to submit to terrorism." Immediately afterwards, her popularity soared almost to the level it had been during the Falklands War. The Saturday after the bombing, Thatcher said to her constituents: "We suffered a tragedy not one of us could have thought would happen in our country. And we picked ourselves up and sorted ourselves out as all good British people do, and I thought, let us stand together for we are British! They were trying to destroy the fundamental freedom that is the birth-right of every British citizen, freedom, justice and democracy."

Approval in Britain
At the time of the bombing, the miners' strike was underway. Morrissey, frontman of the English alternative rock band the Smiths, joked shortly after: "The only sorrow of the Brighton bombing is that Thatcher escaped unscathed." David Bret wrote in the book Morrissey: Scandal & Passion that "The tabloids were full of such remarks; jokes about the tragedy were cracked on radio and television programmes. A working-men's club in South Yorkshire seriously considered a whip-round "to pay for the bomber to have another go". In 1986, English punk band the Angelic Upstarts celebrated the IRA's assassination attempt with their single "Brighton Bomb". They released an album of the same name in 1987.

Patrick Magee

Once investigators had narrowed the seat of the blast to the bathroom of Room 629, police began to track down everyone who had stayed in the room. This eventually led them to "Roy Walsh", a pseudonym used by IRA member Patrick Magee. Magee was tailed for months by MI5 and special branch, and finally arrested in an IRA flat in Glasgow. Despite days of interrogation he refused to answer questions – but a fingerprint on a registration card recovered from the hotel ruins was enough to convict him. He was arrested on 24 June 1985 with other members of an IRA active service unit while planning further bombings in England. Many years later, in August 2000, Magee admitted to The Guardian that he carried out the bombing, but told them he did not accept he left a fingerprint on the registration card, saying "If that was my fingerprint I did not put it there".

In September 1985, Magee (then aged 35) was found guilty of planting the bomb, detonating it, and of five counts of murder. Magee received eight life sentences: seven for offences relating to the Brighton bombing, and the eighth for another bomb plot. Justice Sir Leslie Boreham recommended that he serve at least 35 years, describing Magee as "a man of exceptional cruelty and inhumanity." Later Home Secretary Michael Howard lengthened this to "whole life". However, Magee was released from prison in 1999 under the terms of the Good Friday Agreement, having served 14 years (including the time before his sentencing). A British Government spokesman said that his release "was hard to stomach" and an appeal by then Home Secretary Jack Straw to forestall it was turned down by the Northern Ireland High Court.

In 2000, Magee spoke about the bombing in an interview with The Sunday Business Post. He told interviewer Tom McGurk that the British government's strategy at the time was to depict the IRA as mere criminals while containing the Troubles within Northern Ireland:

Of those killed in the bombing, Magee said: "I deeply regret that anybody had to lose their lives, but at the time did the Tory ruling class expect to remain immune from what their frontline troops were doing to us?"

Attitudes towards security
Daily Telegraph journalist David Hughes called the bombing "the most audacious attack on a British government since the Gunpowder Plot" and wrote that it "marked the end of an age of comparative innocence. From that day forward, all party conferences in this country have become heavily defended citadels".

In popular culture
The bombing is depicted in the 2011 biographical film The Iron Lady.

Jonathan Lee's 2015 novel High Dive is a fictionalised account of the bombing, written largely from the alternating perspectives of the hotel manager, his teenage daughter, and an IRA bombmaker who helps Magee. Rights to the book were purchased and it is in development as a potential feature film.

The third novel in Adrian McKinty's "Troubles Trilogy", In the Morning I'll Be Gone, features his RUC detective protagonist Seán Duffy trying to prevent the Brighton bombing and saving Thatcher.

In the third season of the alternate history TV series For All Mankind, an opening news reel reports that Margaret Thatcher was killed in the attack.

See also

 Carlton Club bombing
 1981 Irish hunger strike
 Assassination of Spencer Perceval
 Chronology of Provisional Irish Republican Army actions (1980–1989)
 Downing Street mortar attack

Notes

References

Sources
 Text of the BBC television news report on the morning of the attack
 BBC News photo journal of the attack
 BBC News report on Straw's attempt to prevent the early release of Magee
 Guardian story on the release of Magee in 1999
 An Phoblacht: Interview with Pat Magee regarding the Brighton bombing
 BBC report on Magee being convicted of the bombing

Further reading
 Charles Moore, Margaret Thatcher: At Her Zenith (2016) 2: 309–16.
 Kieran Hughes, Terror Attack Brighton – Blowing up the Iron Lady (2014).
 Steve Ramsey, Something Has Gone Wrong – Dealing with the Brighton Bomb (2018).

1984 in British politics
1984 in England
1984 murders in the United Kingdom
1980s building bombings
20th century in Brighton and Hove
20th-century mass murder in England
Attacks on buildings and structures in 1984
Attacks on hotels in Europe
Building bombings in England
Crime in Brighton and Hove
Failed assassination attempts in the United Kingdom
Hotel bombing
History of the Conservative Party (UK)
Hotel bombings
Improvised explosive device bombings in 1984
Mass murder in 1984
Murder in East Sussex
October 1984 crimes
October 1984 events in the United Kingdom
Provisional IRA bombings in England
Terrorist incidents in the United Kingdom in 1984
Political violence in England